Gil Schwartz (May 20, 1951May 2, 2020), known by his pen name Stanley Bing, was an American business humorist and novelist. He wrote a column for Fortune magazine for more than twenty years after a decade at Esquire magazine. He was the author of thirteen books, including What Would Machiavelli Do? and The Curriculum, a satirical textbook for a business school that also offers lessons on the web. Schwartz was senior executive vice president of corporate communications and Chief Communications Officer for CBS.

Early life and education 
Schwartz was born May 20, 1951 in New York City, and was raised in New Rochelle, New York. He earned a Bachelor of Arts degree in English and Theatre Arts from Brandeis University.

Career
After graduating from college, Schwartz intended to become a playwright. He was a co-founder of Next Move Theatre, an improv troupe based in Boston. Schwartz later landed a communications job at Westinghouse Broadcasting.

Writing 
Schwartz was a columnist, novelist, and writer of a large body of work dedicated to exploring the relationship between pathology and authority. He first appeared in the pages of Esquire with a one-page column at the back of the magazine on corporate strategies. In a few years, he moved to the front of the magazine and began a series of 2500-word essays, mainly focused on business-related topics.

His first book was a satirical collection of business terms called Bizwords, based on the concept of The Devil's Dictionary. Crazy Bosses, which established the early groundwork for his subsequent career, was published in 1992. At that point Schwartz, who had been writing in secret within a large multinational corporation, revealed his alter ego to colleagues at Westinghouse, who had until then known him only by his given name. Thereafter, he continued to appear as Schwartz in business settings but published primarily under his pseudonym. A series of best-selling business books followed, including What Would Machiavelli Do?: The Ends Justify The Meanness; Throwing The Elephant: Zen and the Art of Managing Up; Sun Tzu Was A Sissy, and, published simultaneously in the spring of 2006, Rome, Inc.: The Rise and Fall of the First Multinational Corporation, and 100 Bullshit Jobs and How To Get Them. In 2007, Schwartz published a thoroughly revised edition of Crazy Bosses, adding a layer of strategy that did not exist in the earlier edition, and in 2008, Executricks: How to Retire While You're Still Working. In 2011, Schwartz published Bingsop's Fables, a version of Aesop's Fables applicable to the business world, populated with corporate archetypes, including The Stupid Investor, the Miserable Misery Mogul, and the Ill-Tempered PR Person. The book was illustrated by Steve Brodner. Schwartz's most recent volume, published in 2014, is The Curriculum: Everything You Need to Know to Be a Master of Business Arts, a 384-page satirical textbook that purportedly provides a complete business education. Illustrated with color PowerPoint graphics, the book includes a core and advanced curriculum, as well as tutorials and electives, with subjects such as "not appearing stupid", "insensitivity training", and "Town Car management".

In a March 2014 interview with Fortune magazine, Schwartz claimed that all of his data came from a think tank he incorporated, The National Association of Serious Studies, which "adheres to the highest standards of Internet journalism."

Schwartz also wrote online. In 2007, he began a daily blog, www.stanleybing.com, which appears on the Fortune website as well as that of its parent, CNNMoney, and also syndicated his writing and video blogs for HuffPost.

Identity 
In 1996, Randall Rothenberg, one of Schwartz's colleagues at Esquire, informed The New York Times that Stanley Bing was actually Gil Schwartz, a CBS executive. The Times published an article under the headline "CBS's Best-Kept Secret (Hint Hint)" revealing Schwartz's identity and noting that he "would probably have been able to keep his Swiftian alter ego a secret, known only to a small circle of friends and colleagues, had he not been so successful at his day job." In the article, Schwartz neither confirmed nor denied the claim that he was Stanley Bing. However former CBS Broadcast Group President Howard Stringer, who was aware of the ruse, compared Schwartz/Bing to Andy Rooney and David Letterman.

Schwartz continued to write the back page for Fortune magazine, while (as Schwartz) holding down a similar post at Men's Health, writing a 2500-word column reminiscent of his earlier work at Esquire.

Personal life 
Schwartz was married to Laura Svienty for 14 years. He had two children, two step-children, and two grandchildren. Schwartz and his wife had previously split their time between Manhattan and Mill Valley, California.

Schwartz died on May 2, 2020 at his home in Santa Monica, California from cardiac arrest. He was 68.

Published works
Biz Words: Power Talk for Fun and Profit. Pocket Books. 1989. .
Crazy Bosses: Spotting Them, Serving Them, Surviving Them. Pocket Books. 1992. ASIN B00921ILOK.
What Would Machiavelli Do? The Ends Justify the Meanness. Collins. 2000. .
Throwing the Elephant: Zen and the Art of Managing Up. Collins. 2002. .
The Big Bing: Black Holes of Time Management, Gaseous Executive Bodies, Exploding Careers, and Other Theories on the Origins of the Business Universe. HarperBusiness. 2003. .
Sun Tzu Was a Sissy: Conquer Your Enemies, Promote Your Friends, and Wage the Real Art of War. HarperBusiness. 2004. .
Rome, Inc. The Rise and Fall of the First Multinational Corporation. W.W. Norton. 2006. .
100 Bullshit Jobs ... And How to Get Them. HarperBusiness. 2006. .
Crazy Bosses: Fully Revised and Updated. HarperBusiness. 2007. .
Executricks: How to Retire While You're Still Working. HarperBusiness. 2008. .
Bingsop's Fables: Little Morals for Big Business. HarperBusiness. 2011. .
The Curriculum: Everything You Need to Know to Be a Master of Business Arts. HarperBusiness. 2014. .

Novels
Lloyd: What Happened. Crown. 1998. .
You Look Nice Today. Bloomsbury USA. 2003. .
Immortal Life (A Soon To Be True Story). Simon & Schuster. 2017. .

References

External links
Stanley Bing's Blog at Fortune Magazine's Website
http://stanleybing.com/ THE Bing Blog 

American columnists
1951 births
2020 deaths
Writers from New Rochelle, New York
Journalists from New York (state)
Writers from New York City
Brandeis University alumni
People from New Rochelle, New York
American humorists